Dunnite, also known as Explosive D or systematically as ammonium picrate, is an explosive developed in 1906 by US Army Major Beverly W. Dunn, who later served as the chief inspector of the Bureau of Transportation Explosives. Ammonium picrate is a salt formed by reacting picric acid and ammonia. It is chemically related to the more stable explosive trinitrotoluene (TNT).

History 
It was the first explosive used in an aerial bombing operation in military history, performed by Italian pilots in Libya in 1911.
It was used extensively by the United States Navy during World War I.

Though Dunnite was generally considered an insensitive substance, by 1911 the United States Army had abandoned its use in favor of other alternatives. The Navy, however, used it in armor-piercing artillery shells and projectiles, and in coastal defense.

Dunnite typically did not detonate on striking heavy armor. Rather, the encasing shell would penetrate the armor, after which the charge would be triggered by a base fuze.

In 2008 caches of discarded Dunnite in remote locations were mistaken for rusty rocks at Cape Porcupine, Newfoundland and Labrador, Canada.

Dunnite can be used as a precursor to the highly stable explosive TATB (1,3,5-triamino-2,4,6-trinitrobenzene), by first dehydrating it to form picramide (attaching the ammonia as an amine group instead of an ion) and then further aminating it.

References 

Ammonium compounds
Explosives
Picrates
Naval artillery